The Handball tournaments at the 2021 Southeast Asian Games took place from 6 to 22 May 2022 in Vietnam. Indoor handball for men and women, and beach handball for men were contested.

Medal summary

Medal table

Medalist

References

Handball
2022 in handball